Akmola Region is a centrally located region of Kazakhstan. It was known as Tselinograd Oblast during Soviet rule. Its capital is Kokshetau. The national capital, Astana, is enclosed by the region, but is politically separate from Akmola Region. The region's population is 715,000; Kokshetau's is 157,000. 

Some gold and coal mining occur in the area.

Geography
The area of the region is 146,200 square kilometers. Akmola, along with Ulytau Region and Karaganda Region are Kazakhstan's only regions which don't touch the country's outer borders. The region borders North Kazakhstan Region in the north, Pavlodar Region in the east, Karagandy Region in the south, and Kostanay Region in the west. The Sileti river flows through the region.

Etymology
Akmola means "the white burial" in Kazakh.

Demographics

Ethnic groups

Religion

Administrative divisions
The region is administratively divided into seventeen districts and the cities of Kokshetau and Stepnogorsk. 
 Kokshetau City Administration, with the administrative center in Kokshetau;
 Akkol District, with the administrative center in the town of Akkol;
 Arshaly District, the settlement of Arshaly;
 Astrakhan District,  selo of Astrakhanka;
 Atbasar District, the town of Atbasar;
 Birjan sal District, the town of Stepnyak;
 Bulandy District, the town of Makinsk;
 Burabay District, the town of Shchuchinsk;
 Egindikol District, the selo of Egindikol;
 Ereymentau District, the town of Ereymentau;
 Esil District, the town of Esil;
 Korgalzhyn District, the selo of Korgalzhyn;
 Sandyktau District, the selo of Balkashino;
 Shortandy District, the settlement of Shortandy;
 Tselinograd District, the selo of Akmol;
 Zerendi District, the selo of Zerendi;
 Zhaksy District, the settlement of Zhaksy;
 Zharkain District, the town of Derzhavinsk.

* The following ten localities in Akmola Region have town status: Akkol, Atbasar, Derzhavinsk, Ereymentau, Esil, Kokshetau, KOSShY, Makinsk, Shchuchinsk, Stepnogorsk, and Stepnyak.

Notable people
David Rigert, weightlifter, Olympic champion, 5x world champion (light-heavyweight and heavyweight), 68 world records.

References

External links

Official website 

Regions of Kazakhstan